Paul Ronald Stewart is the English drummer in the British band The Feeling.

He went to St Wilfrid's Catholic School, Crawley, where he met Kevin Jeremiah and Ciaran Jeremiah, now fellow members of The Feeling.

He lives in St Albans, Hertfordshire, with his wife, former Fame Academy graduate Sinéad Quinn.  They became engaged on 9 October 2007 and were married in Quinn's hometown Irvinestown, Northern Ireland on 6 December 2008.

He also plays in his wife's band, Sinead and the Dawnbreakers.

Influences
Stewart's drumming influences include Mick Fleetwood of Fleetwood Mac and Ringo Starr of The Beatles.

References

Living people
English rock drummers
People from Crawley
Year of birth missing (living people)